Sandcastle Waterpark is a water park located in the Pittsburgh suburb of West Homestead. The park is located on a  piece of land along the banks of the Monongahela River. Sandcastle is owned by Palace Entertainment, subsidiary of Spain-based Parques Reunidos, who purchased original parent company Kennywood Entertainment. The company runs its original sister parks, Kennywood, Idlewild Park, and Lake Compounce. The park contains fourteen water slides, several swimming pools, and a handful of other attractions.

History
The site where Sandcastle currently sits was formerly a railroad yard for U.S. Steel. In 1988, Kennywood Entertainment bought the land and began construction on the park. Sandcastle officially opened for business in July 1989.

Current Attractions

The park has a total of 14 water slides including 3 speed slides. Other slides include the Blue Tooba Looba (which replaced Bermuda Triangle, the only closed slide in the park), Thunder Run, Tubers Tower and Cliffhangers. Other attractions at Sandcastle include a "lazy river," a large swimming pool, Mon-Tsunami, a wave pool, and an area of water slides and water attractions designed specifically for children called Wet Willies. The park also features an entertainment complex called The Sandbar. In January 2007, the Chevrolet Amphitheatre, formerly known as the IC Light Amphitheatre, under plans by concert promoter Live Nation, was disassembled. According to new design plans, the new amphitheater will rest between Sandcastle's west perimeter and the Waterfront section of Homestead Borough along the Monongahela River. Sandcastle already had an existing amphitheatre on the property, but was outdated and was seldom used.

Former Attractions
The only slide ever removed was where The Blue TubaLuba is today. It was called "The Bermuda Triangle". It was a body slide; however, it had the same structure as a tube slide. Early in its life, Sandcastle also offered a miniature golf course, a go-kart track and beach volleyball courts; they have since been replaced by the Mon Tsunami wave pool and Dragon's Den slide respectively, although the sand pit leftover from the courts is still next to the Dragon's Den attraction.

Location
The park is located in West Homestead, a suburb of Pittsburgh. The water park is located down the road from the Waterfront, a large shopping complex with stores, restaurants, and movie theaters. The park can be easily accessed via Interstate 376, and one PAT Transit bus line, the 59 Mon Valley (which also runs past Sandcastle's sister park Kennywood) runs near the park, but does not run up to it.

External links
Official website
Blog Discussion of Amphitheater addition to Waterfront area

Water parks in Pennsylvania
Buildings and structures in Allegheny County, Pennsylvania
Tourist attractions in Allegheny County, Pennsylvania
Tourist attractions in Pittsburgh
1989 establishments in Pennsylvania
Palace Entertainment
Amusement parks opened in 1989